A Provost Sergeant is a non-commissioned officer associated with military police.

United Kingdom and Commonwealth realm

In the British Army and land forces of the Commonwealth, a Provost Sergeant (sometimes abbreviated to Provo Sgt) is the non-commissioned officer in charge of the Regimental Provost (or Regimental Police) and is responsible to the Regimental Sergeant Major for the maintenance of good order and military discipline in a regiment or battalion. The Provo Sgt is a member of the regiment or corps in which he serves and not a member of the Royal Military Police. A Provost Sergeant normally holds the military rank of Sergeant, the Provost Sergeant title being an appointment and not a rank.  A Provost Sergeant wears no distinctive trade badge.  He can, however, be identified by the brassard he wears on his uniform, which carries the letters "PS" or "RP" as well as his sergeant's stripes.

United States
In the United States Army Military Police Corps or United States Marine Corps Military Police, the title of Provost Sergeant typically refers to the operations sergeant in charge of the staff of the Provost Marshal office or the NCO in charge of an MP station. The position is commonly held by a Sergeant Major or Master Gunnery Sergeant, but may also be held by a Sergeant First Class or Master Sergeant. U.S. Army Provost Sergeants cannot be recognized by any specific insignia and few Provost Sergeants even wear the distinctive military police identification patch on their Army Combat Uniform.

See also
Provost Marshal

References

Military police of the United Kingdom
Military police of the United States
Military provost ranks